IEEE Antennas and Wireless Propagation Letters is an annual peer-reviewed scientific journal with the goal of rapid dissemination of short manuscripts in the antennas and wireless propagation domains. It is an official journal of the IEEE Antennas & Propagation Society. The current editor-in-chief is Professor Christophe Fumeaux  (The University of Adelaide).

Abstracting and indexing 
The journal is abstracted and indexed by Science Citation Index Expanded and Current Contents/Engineering, Computing & Technology. According to the Journal Citation Reports, the journal had a impact factor of 3.834 in 2020.

History 
The journal was established in 2002 with Piergiorgio Uslenghi (University of Illinois at Chicago) as the founding editor-in-chief. He was succeeded in 2008 by Professor Gianluca Lazzi (University of Utah). Professor Yang Hao (Queen Mary University of London) became the editor-in-chief during 2013 and 2017.

References

External links 
 

Physics journals
Antennas and Wireless Propagation Letters
Annual journals
Publications established in 2002
English-language journals